Larry Wyse (born 13 November 1956 in Dublin) was an Irish soccer player during the 1980s and 1990s.

He represented Shamrock Rovers, Bohemian, Athlone Town and Dundalk amongst others during his career. He made 4 appearances for Bohemians in European competition.

In Rovers' opening game of the 1976-77 League of Ireland Mick Leech and Wyse scored in a 2–1 win over Albert Rovers F.C.

However, when John Giles took over Wyse signed for Athlone Town in October 1977. Wyse had seven successful seasons at the midlands club where he was Player of the Month in September 1983.

He returned home to sign for Bohemian in July 1984 

After two seasons at Dalymount Park he signed for Dundalk F.C. in July 1986  He again won the Player of the Month in January 1989.

Honours
 League of Ireland: 3
 Athlone Town 1980–81, 1982–83
 Dundalk - 1987–88
 FAI Cup: 2
 Dundalk - 1988
 Galway United - 1991
 League of Ireland Cup: 5
 Shamrock Rovers - 1976/77
 Dundalk - 1989/90
 Athlone Town 1979–80, 1981–82, 1982–83
 Leinster Senior Cup (football)
 Bohemian F.C. - 1985

Sources 
 The Hoops by Paul Doolan and Robert Goggins
 Irish Football Handbook by Dave Galvin & Gerry Desmond

References 

Republic of Ireland association footballers
Association football midfielders
League of Ireland players
League of Ireland XI players
Shamrock Rovers F.C. players
Bohemian F.C. players
Athlone Town A.F.C. players
Dundalk F.C. players
Galway United F.C. (1937–2011) players
1956 births
Living people